Universidad Monteávila is a private, Roman Catholic - Opus Dei - University in Caracas, Venezuela, founded in 1998. Its education is humanities-based, offering majors in Law, Education, Business Administration and Social Communication.

Universities and colleges in Caracas
Catholic universities and colleges in Venezuela
Educational institutions established in 1998
1998 establishments in Venezuela
Opus Dei universities and colleges